The 2012 Halifax Regional Municipality municipal election was held on October 20, 2012 to elect councillors and a mayor to a four-year term on the Halifax Regional Council, the governing body of the Halifax Regional Municipality. This election was one of many across Nova Scotia as part of the 2012 Nova Scotia municipal elections.

In December 2011 it was decided by the Nova Scotia Utility and Review Board that the Halifax Regional Council be reduced in size from 23 districts to 16 districts, consequently forcing almost every district boundary in the HRM to be redrawn. Some incumbent councillors were forced to run against each other because of the redrawn districts.

Candidates and results
Candidates were officially nominated on September 11, 2012.

Halifax Regional Municipality Mayor
On February 22, 2012 incumbent Mayor Peter J. Kelly announced that he would not be running again for mayor in 2012, opting to finish his term because being mayor had taken a negative toll on his personal life.

District 1: Waverley - Fall River - Musquodoboit Valley

District 2: Preston - Porters Lake - Eastern Shore

District 3: Dartmouth South - Eastern Passage

District 4: Cole Harbour - Westphal

District 5: Dartmouth Centre

District 6: Harbourview - Burnside - Dartmouth East

By-election held January 23, 2016 to replace Fisher, who was elected to the House of Commons:

District 7: Peninsula South - Downtown

District 8: Peninsula North

District 9: Peninsula West - Armdale

District 10: Birch Cove - Rockingham - Fairview

District 11: Spryfield - Sambro - Prospect Road

District 12: Timberlea - Beechville - Clayton Park West

District 13: Hammonds Plains - St. Margarets

District 14: Upper/Middle Sackville - Beaver Bank

District 15: Lower Sackville

District 16: Bedford - Wentworth

References

External links
HRM Elections

2012
2012 elections in Canada